António dos Santos Ferreira André (born 24 December 1957) is a Portuguese retired footballer who played as a defensive midfielder.

He gained notoriety for his tough tackling which on occasion bordered on the violent, and was best known for his lengthy spell with Porto, with which he won several domestic and continental accolades.

Club career
At the age of 13, André entered hometown Rio Ave FC's youth system, as he complemented the sporting activities with fishing in the high sea, in which his family was involved – it was also one of the main activities at Vila do Conde, where he was born.

André signed his first professional contract in 1978, also up north with Varzim SC, although he continued to work with his family. Still, he produced four solid seasons at the club, scoring a career-high ten goals in 1983–84.

Under the advice of legendary club manager José Maria Pedroto, FC Porto signed André in that summer. After initial difficulties due to injuries, he was firmly installed in the side's central midfield, remaining there for nine consecutive years and helping the team win 19 titles overall.

In his last two years, André was challenged for position by the player who regarded him as his role model, Paulinho Santos, and appeared less. He retired at the age of 37, winning the Primeira Liga in his last season as Porto was managed by Bobby Robson, in what would be the first of five consecutive national titles for the club.

André retired in June 1995 with 379 games in the main division, scoring 41 goals and adding to that 48 matches with four goals in European competition. He then continued to work with Porto, as an assistant for several coaches; he was chosen by Portuguese sports newspaper Record as one of the best 100 Portuguese football players ever.

International career
André earned 20 caps for the Portugale national team, making his debut on 30 January 1985 in a friendly with Romania as the latter won it 3–2 in Lisbon. He represented the nation at the 1986 FIFA World Cup, playing in the entire 1–0 win against England and also appearing against Poland, but Portugal exited in the group stage.

|}

Personal life
André's son, André, is also a footballer and a midfielder. He too played for Porto and Varzim and the Portuguese national side.

Honours
Primeira Liga: 1984–85, 1985–86, 1987–88, 1989–90, 1991–92, 1992–93, 1994–95
Taça de Portugal: 1987–88, 1990–91, 1993–94
Supertaça Cândido de Oliveira: 1984, 1986, 1990, 1991, 1993, 1994
European Cup: 1986–87
UEFA Super Cup: 1987
Intercontinental Cup: 1987

Bibliography
Dias, Rui – Record – 100 Melhores do Futebol Português – Volume I (Record – The 100 best of Portuguese Football); EDISPORT, 2002

References

External links

1957 births
Living people
People from Vila do Conde
Portuguese footballers
Association football midfielders
Primeira Liga players
Liga Portugal 2 players
Rio Ave F.C. players
G.D. Ribeirão players
Varzim S.C. players
FC Porto players
Portugal international footballers
1986 FIFA World Cup players
Sportspeople from Porto District